David Samson (born 1956) is an Orthodox rabbi and one of the leading English-speaking Torah scholars in the Religious Zionist movement in Israel, and an educational entrepreneur. Rabbi Samson has written six books, most of which are on the teachings of Rabbi Avraham Yitzchak Kook and Rabbi Zvi Yehuda Kook.

Rabbi Samson was born in Baltimore, Maryland.  His grandfather was Rabbi Chaim Eliezer Samson, who was the Rosh Yeshiva of the Talmudical Academy of Baltimore for over 50 years. After moving to Israel, he studied under the tutelage of Rabbi Zvi Yehuda Kook for twelve years.  He served as a congregational rabbi of Kehillat Dati Leumi synagogue in Har Nof, Jerusalem. He taught Talmud and Jewish Studies at Yashlatz.

Rabbi David Samson is also the founder of Arutz Sheva English broadcasting and created his own radio talk show from now until midnight. He appeared on the weekly TV feature magazine "Israeli Salad" on Arutz Sheva broadcast. In 2003, he founded Atid, a non-profit organization for youth at risk. He then founded Maale Erev Institutions in 2004, a set of high schools for youth at risk, and Yeshivat Lech Lecha, a mobile high school based in jeeps. In recent years Rabbi Samson has opened up a number of schools. In 2008 he started Yerushalayim Torah Academy (Y.T.A), a Yeshiva High School for English speakers located in Jerusalem. It is designed especially for the immigrant community and offers a new and innovative program that has become the model for the Ministry of Education.  Then he opened YTA for girls, a similar program for girls located in Ramot Jerusalem. In September 2011, he founded a third yeshiva high school for English speakers, this one located in Kfar Saba.

In 2014, he founded the Lone Star Language Academy, a network of language schools in Texas.

In 2020, Rabbi Samson Founded the King Soloman Academy, which is a program designed for Jewish middle and high school students who are interested in furthering their Jewish knowledge. Rabbi Samson Described the purpose of founding the King Soloman Academy as to create affordable Jewish education while creating an engaging digital experience.

He is presently the founder and dean of Atid institutions in Israel, and the founder and dean of the Lone Star Language Academy in Texas.

Books by Rabbi Samson

References

 http://tjpnews.com/lone-star-hebrew-academy-to-offer-hebrew-language-immersion-program/

External links
Maale Erev Institutions

YTA's Official site
Atid
ynet Hanukkah and ynet Passover(in Hebrew) - projects of Rabbi Samson to make history relevant to young people

Living people
Religious Zionist Orthodox rabbis
Mercaz HaRav alumni
1956 births
Religious leaders from Baltimore
American emigrants to Israel
Jewish educators